ISTP may refer to:

 a Myers–Briggs Type Indicator personality type 
 a Socionics personality type 
 International Solar-Terrestrial Physics Science Initiative, an international research collaboration
 International School of the Peninsula, in Palo Alto, California
 Index to Scientific & Technical Proceedings, a scholarly literature database

See also
ITSP